Ace Combat Advance is a 2005 combat flight simulation video game in the Ace Combat series. Developed by Hungarian studio Humansoft, it is the first entry in the series released on a handheld game console and the first 2D entry in the series. Unlike other Ace Combat games, Advance was not released in Japan. It was criticized on release for its awkward controls, lack of appeal, difficulty, and poor graphics.

Gameplay
Unlike the usual flight simulation games in the Ace Combat series, Advance is a top-down shooter similar to Strike, but using fighter aircraft instead of attack helicopters.

The game's campaign is divided into 12 missions. These missions are very similar to those in the rest of the Ace Combat series, but there are a few unique missions that require new tactics.

Plot
In the year 2032, eight years before the events of Ace Combat 3: Electrosphere, globalization has blurred the borders between countries, and megacorporations have become worldwide economic superpowers. One of these megacorporations, General Resources Ltd., uses state of the art military equipment and their Air Strike Force (ASF) to destroy anybody who could potentially pose a threat to their superiority. A new international military is created to fight back, spearheaded by an elite fighter squadron called the United Air Defense (UAD), which the player is part of.

Reception

References

2005 video games
Game Boy Advance games
Game Boy Advance-only games
Video games developed in Hungary
Video games set in the 2030s
Single-player video games
Ace Combat spin-off games